Firer is a surname. Notable people with the surname include:

Avraham Elimelech Firer (born 1954), Israeli rabbi
Ivan Firer (born 1984), Slovenian footballer
Susan Firer (born 1948), American poet

See also
 Fire (disambiguation)
 Firor